The Norwottuck Branch Rail Trail, formerly the Norwottuck Rail Trail, is an  combination bicycle/pedestrian paved rail trail running from Northampton, Massachusetts, through Hadley and Amherst, to Belchertown, Massachusetts. It opened in 1992, and is now part of the longer Mass Central Rail Trail.

History
The rail bed under which the trail operated opened in 1887 under the control of the Central Massachusetts Railroad. Shortly after its completion, it was leased by the Boston and Maine Railroad and referred to as the Central Massachusetts Branch. Three round trip passenger trains were run in the 1920s, as well as numerous freight trains. Competition from cars and trucks caused a decline on the line, as passenger service was discontinued in 1932 and freight service managed to hang on for another forty-two years, primarily to deliver goods to a farmer's supply warehouse in Amherst.

The rail bed was acquired by the state in 1985 and developed into the trail in 1993, as its current name. The name of "Norwottuck" was the result of a suggestion by the Hadley Historical Commission, who believed that the name corresponded to the local Native American tribe, the Norwottucks. It was also the term for the entire area.

Use

This trail is used by bicyclers, rollerbladers, and hikers. Both recreational and commuter traffic occurs here.

Sights to see include the Norwottuck Rail Trail Bridge over the Connecticut River. The beaver pond near the eastern end of the trail is host to a number of different kinds of birds including great blue heron and various woodpeckers, as well as ducks, turtles, and various other critters.

Extension
A westward extension from Damon Road to Woodmont Road in Northampton opened in 2007. The trail ends close to the Northampton Bikeway, which runs from the other side of King Street to Florence and Look Park. Construction of a rail with trail project southward to downtown Northampton and Easthampton (to connect with the Manhan Rail Trail) is in the planning stages, as is a tunnel underneath the active rail line to join with the Northampton Bikeway. An underpass connecting the trail with the Northampton Bikeway north of downtown Northampton was expect to be bid on in 2015 and was expected to be completed in 2016. Trail users had been frustrated with the missing connection for years. Bidding on the project was closed in March 2016. The Massachusetts Department of Transportation selected Northern Construction Service for the $4.4 million tunnel with an expected completion in October 2017. The tunnel was opened in early November 2017. There are various other possible connections being considered, such as a connection to the Canalside Rail Trail.

There is a movement in progress to create a  bicycle path from Boston westward, which would incorporate the Norwottuck Rail Trail as part of its length.

Reconstruction
The original trail had degraded over time. One aspect of the problem is that the original pavement was an attempt at being "green", and incorporated crushed used glass bottles as part of its aggregate. This material had been slowly emerging over time, causing flat tires and other issues.

As a response to the condition of the trail, the Massachusetts Department of Conservation and Recreation and the Massachusetts Department of Transportation Highway Division embarked on the Norwottuck Branch Rail Trail Rehabilitation Project. After being under discussion for several years, the $4 million reconstruction project got underway in August 2013; it was completed in June 2015.

See also
 Norwottuck Rail Trail Bridge
 Central Massachusetts Railroad

References

External links

Norwottuck Rail Trail Massachusetts Department of Conservation and Recreation
Norwottuck Rail Trail Map Massachusetts Department of Conservation and Recreation
Friends of Northampton Trails and Greenways
Northampton Bike Underpass Design Plans

Protected areas of Hampshire County, Massachusetts
Rail trails in Massachusetts
Amherst, Massachusetts
Northampton, Massachusetts
History of Hampshire County, Massachusetts
Protected areas established in 1992
1992 establishments in Massachusetts